Aurora Australis was the "first book ever written, printed, illustrated and bound in the Antarctic".

Bibliographic details 

Aurora Australis was written during the British Imperial Antarctic Expedition or the Nimrod Expedition (1908–09) led by Ernest Shackleton. Produced entirely by members of the expedition, the book was edited by Shackleton, illustrated with lithographs and etchings by George Marston, printed by Ernest Joyce and Frank Wild, and bound by Bernard Day. The production of Aurora Australis was one of the cultural activities Shackleton encouraged while the expedition team over-wintered at Cape Royds on Ross Island in the McMurdo Sound, to ensure that "the spectre known as 'polar ennui' never made its appearance".

Because the copies of Aurora Australis were unnumbered, it is unclear exactly how many were produced; it is believed that one hundred copies were created, of which less than seventy have been accounted for. Copies of the book are often identified by the original stencils on the inside of the covers, which were made of boards from wooden supply boxes. Shackleton may have originally intended to sell copies of the book on his return from the Antarctic, but instead they were all distributed among the members of the expedition and given to other "friends and benefactors of the expedition".

Sections
The book is divided into 10 sections, each written by members of the crew. The sections are as follows. 
 The Ascent of Mount Erubus  T. W. Edgeworth David.
 Midwinter Night   Nemo (E. H. Shackleton)
 Trials of a Messman   A Messman
 A Pony Watch  Putty (George Marston)
 Southward Bound  Lapsus Linguæ
 An Interview with an Emperor  A. F. M.
 Erubus  Nemo (E. H. Shackleton)
 An Ancient Manuscript  Shellback (Frank Willd)
 Life under Difficulties  James Murray
 Bathybia  Douglas Mawson

References

Further reading 

 Shackleton, E. (1986). Aurora Australis. Paradigm Press. 
 Shacklteon, E. (1999). The Heart of the Antarctic: Being the Story of the British Antarctic Expedition, 1907-1909. Carroll & Graf. 
 Freemantle, James (2019). An Albion in the Antarctic. St James Park Press

External links 

 Scanned copy at Archive.org
 Article and image by The National Maritime Museum, Greenwich
 Article and cover image at the State Library of South Australia
 Aurora Australis online using the Turning the Pages software (requires Shockwave plugin)
 Aurora Australis scanned by eBooks@Adelaide and rendered into HTML

Printing in Antarctica
Ernest Shackleton
1908 non-fiction books
Books about Antarctica
Travel books